The 2024 Pennsylvania elections will take place on . On that date, the Commonwealth of Pennsylvania will hold elections for the following offices: President of the United States, U.S. Senate, U.S. House of Representatives, Pennsylvania State Senate, Pennsylvania House of Representatives, and various others.

Federal offices

President and Vice President of the United States 
Incumbent Democratic President Joe Biden and Vice-President Kamala Harris are eligible for a second term.

U.S. Senate 

Incumbent Democratic senator Bob Casey Jr. will seek a fourth term.

U.S. House of Representatives 
All 17 congressional districts in the United States House of Representatives from Pennsylvania are up for election in 2024.

State offices

Executive Offices

Attorney General 

Attorney General Josh Shapiro, who was re-elected in 2020, was ineligible to seek a third term in 2024 due to term limits; instead, Shapiro was elected as governor in 2022. In accordance with Article IV, Section 8 of the Pennsylvania Constitution, upon taking office as governor Shapiro will be permitted to nominate his successor as attorney general, who will serve the remaining two years of the term.

Treasurer 
Incumbent Republican treasurer Stacy Garrity was elected in 2020 and is eligible for a second term.

Auditor General

Pennsylvania Senate

Pennsylvania House of Representatives

Ballot measures 
, there are no statewide ballot measures scheduled to run in 2024.

See also 
 Elections in Pennsylvania
 Political party strength in Pennsylvania
 Politics of Pennsylvania

References 

Pennsylvania
2024 Pennsylvania elections
Pennsylvania elections